

Elections

Aguascalientes 
There were elections for 11 mayors and 18 local councillors.

Baja California 
There were elections for the governor, 5 mayors and 25 councillors. 

The PAN candidate, Francisco Vega de Lamadrid narrowly defeated PRI candidate Fernando Castro Trenti, and became the next governor of Baja California. The election count was temporarily halted after local officials believed there was an error with an counting algorithm.

Chihuahua 
There were elections for 67 mayors and 33 councillors.

Coahuila 
There were elections for 38 mayors in all municipalities.

Durango 
There were elections for 39 mayors and 30 councillors.

Hidalgo 
There were elections for 30 mayors.

Oaxaca 
There were elections for 570 mayors and 42 councillors.

Puebla 
There were elections for 217 mayors and 41 councillors.

Quintana Roo 
There were elections for 10 mayors and 25 councillors.

Sinaloa 
There were elections for 18 mayors and 40 councillors.

Tamaulipas 
There were elections for 88 mayors and 436 councillors.

Tlaxcala 
There were elections for 60 mayors, 32 councillors, and 391 presidents of communities.

Veracruz 
There were elections for 212 mayors and 50 councillors.

Zacatecas 
There were elections for 58 mayors and 30 councillors.

References 

Elections in Mexico
2013 elections in Mexico
July 2013 events in Mexico